Shark Attack 3: Megalodon is the second sequel to Shark Attack, released in 2002 direct-to-video. The film is notable for featuring John Barrowman, who later found fame in popular shows such as Doctor Who and Torchwood. Barrowman has said in an interview on Friday Night with Jonathan Ross that he only did the film for the money (on QI, he claimed it paid for his first house), and was rather embarrassed when a clip from the film was shown. Actress Jenny McShane from the first Shark Attack film has a starring role, albeit as a completely different character.

When two researchers discover a colossal shark's tooth off the Mexican coast their worst fears surface - the most menacing beast to ever rule the waters, Megalodon, is still alive and mercilessly feeding on anything that crosses its path. The film is also notable because certain clips from it have become popular internet memes due to the unconvincing special effects, size-changing shark, and bizarre dialogue.

Plot
A group of divers are installing a power cable at the bottom of the Pacific Ocean, when a shark swims up and kills one of them. Six months later, lifeguard Ben Carpenter and his partner Esai drive out to sea to catch some lobster. While diving, Ben finds a broken power cable with a large shark tooth stuck in it. After he pulls out the tooth, he is caught by two other divers, and soon goes back to land. Later he posts a description of the tooth online, but as he cannot find a matching shark tooth on the internet, he names it "mystery shark". Natural history researcher named Cataline "Cat" Stone gets the message, finds him and looks at the tooth. She believes it to come from a huge prehistoric shark called megalodon (Greek for "big tooth").

Ben meets with his friend Chuck Rampart, who tells him he intends to take a look at the broken power cable. Ben tells him about the shark. Later, the animal kills two people who use a waterslide in the middle of the night. The next day Cat and her partners go out on a boat to find and tag the megalodon, which is revealed to only be a  juvenile. The shark shows up and smashes into their boat. Davis films it while Cat hooks a camera onto the sharks dorsal fin. The megalodon leaves and later kills a man who is playing frisbee on the beach with his dog. Ben finds the man's severed leg and informs Cat about the attack; she in turn tells him about the megalodon, additionally saying it is a juvenile. Angry that she lied to him, he leaves.

The next day Ben, Cat, Davis and another partner go out to kill the shark, which they find out is heading toward a nearby resort. They manage to drive it back out to sea, where it kills several more people. Ben tries to get his boss, Luis Ruiz, to close the beaches. Ruiz says he will, and then tells Ben to kill the megalodon.

The crew goes back out to sea to kill the shark for good. Ben stabs the animal, which in turn begins ramming the boat, knocking Davis out cold. Cat goes into the cabin to get her shotgun, but the megalodon bursts into the boat, trying to eat her. Ben comes to her aid, beating the shark with a bat. Cat grabs her gun and shoots the shark, killing it. Afterwards, Esai arrives on his speedboat, when suddenly, the first shark's enraged mother, a much larger  megalodon, surfaces and swallows him and his boat whole. The shark then capsizes the boat, and swallows Davis and his friend in one bite. Ben and Cat are rescued by a helicopter and leave. Ben shows Ruiz the shark tooth, but his boss still refuses to close the beaches. Later Ben and Cat go over to Chuck's house, loading a torpedo into Chuck's midget submarine.

The next day, Ben and Chuck go down in the submarine. The megalodon attacks a yacht, slamming into it a couple of times, knocking several people overboard. They escape to two large safety rafts. Ruiz steals a woman's life jacket and jumps off the yacht, only to be swallowed whole by the shark, as is one of the rafts. Tolley attempts to escape on a jet ski, but he ends up driving straight into the megalodon's wide open jaw. Chuck then goes into the water and tags the shark. Ben eventually launches the torpedo, which succeeds in destroying the creature. Ben swims to the surface with Chuck and climbs into the raft. They all celebrate their success, elsewhere another megalodon is shown swimming near a shore, hinting there might be more megalodons.

Cast
 John Barrowman as Ben Carpenter
 Jenny McShane as Cataline Stone
 Ryan Cutrona as Chuck Rampart
 Bashar Rahal as Luis Ruiz
 George Stanchev as Esai/"Sy" 
 Harry Anichkin as Mr. Tolley
 Rosi Chernogorova as Sherry
 Plamen Zahov as Hector
 Ivo Tonchev as Ramirez
 Georgio Borissov as Raymond
 Jordan Karadjov as Chimpy
 Yavor Ralinov as Phillip
 Nikolay Sotirov as Davis
 Atanas Srebrev as Freidman
 Miroslav Marinov as Paul
 Velizar Peev as Harry
 Atanas Georgiev as Scott
 Malina Georgieva as Gina
 Simeon Vladov as Chris

Reception
Critical response was mostly negative. On Rotten Tomatoes it has an approval rating of 20% based on reviews from 5 critics.

Scott Weinberg of efilmcritic.com writes: "The awfulness is one thing; the plagiarism is something else" and suggested the film makers plagiarized the novel Meg: A Novel of Deep Terror. Weinberg says he got a single laugh from the terrible dialog and that "Shark Attack 3 is simply inept in every way".

Internet meme
 A clip showing the shark attacking the yacht has received over 60 million views on YouTube.
 A video on YouTube entitled "That Famous Line" shows a scene from the movie, in which John Barrowman's character proposes to Jenny McShane's character "What do you say I take you home and eat your pussy?" and has received over two point eight million views. In an interview on Jonathan Ross, Barrowman stated the director asked him to improvise a line in order to make McShane laugh and he came up with it, and was surprised that it was kept in the film when he watched with his nephews for the first time. McShane gave no reaction to Barrowman's line. The director David Worth said he had kept the line in the film because he found it hilarious and John delivered the line so well.

See also
 Shark Attack
 Shark Attack 2
 Shark Zone
 Megalodon
 Mega Shark Versus Giant Octopus
 Mega Shark Versus Mecha Shark

References

External links
 

2002 horror films
2002 direct-to-video films
2002 action films
2000s thriller films
Nu Image films
Internet memes
Films about shark attacks
2000s monster movies
Giant monster films
Films shot in Bulgaria
Direct-to-video sequel films
American monster movies
Films directed by David Worth (cinematographer)
2000s English-language films
Films produced by Boaz Davidson
2000s American films